Carl Townsend Osburn (May 5, 1884 – December 28, 1966) was a United States Navy officer and sport shooter from Jacksontown, Ohio. After graduating from the United States Naval Academy in 1906, Osburn went on to reach the rank of commander. He competed in the 1912 Summer Olympics, 1920 Summer Olympics, and 1924 Summer Olympics, winning a total of eleven Olympic medals: five gold (including two individual golds), four silver, and two bronze. He is the most successful shooter at the Olympic Games when individual and team medals are both taken into the account. His tally of eleven medals made him the leading male medal winner for the United States at the Olympic Games until Michael Phelps broke this record, after Mark Spitz equalled it in 1972.

Military history
Osburn was admitted to the U.S. Naval Academy as a midshipman on August 1, 1903, graduating in 1906, earlier than scheduled, to address a shortage of naval officers. He was assigned for his sea service as a midshipman on board  from October 12, 1906 to June 1908.

During operations off Cuba in 1908, he earned the right to wear the Cuban Pacification Medal. Osburn was commissioned an ensign on February 12, 1909. Additionally, in 1909.

Promoted to lieutenant (j. g.) on February 12, 1912, Osburn was detailed in April from Mississippi to participate from June to July in the 1912 Olympic Games in Stockholm, Sweden, where he competed in rifle marksmanship.

From September 22, 1913, until April 1915, Osburn saw shore duty at the U.S. Naval Academy, and then on May 13, 1915, returned to sea duty on board the presidential yacht , being promoted to lieutenant on July 29, 1915. He received promotion to the permanent rank of lieutenant commander on July 1, 1919.

On December 18, 1922, Osburn was assigned as the naval inspector of ordnance at the Bausch & Lomb Optical Company in Rochester, New York, remaining there until March 1925. On April 14, 1925, Osburn took command of the newly re-commissioned , which lasted until June 1927.

Returning to shore duty on January 20, 1932, with the Bureau of Navigation, Osburn received his promotion to captain on October 1, 1933. On June 30, 1936, Osburn returned to shore duty with the 12th Naval District in San Francisco.

In 1937 he was made the Director, Naval Reserves, for the 12th Naval District. Osburn retired with the rank of captain in 1939 but was recalled to active duty in 1941 to serve as the war plans officer of the 12th Naval District, San Francisco until 1945.

Personal life
After the Second World War Osburn settled with his wife, Mary, at St. Helena, in the Napa Valley, California, where he died on December 28, 1966.

Osburn's widow donated his collection of medals, trophies and memorabilia to the Naval Historical Foundation in 1967 by his widow. These artifacts are now in the custody of the Naval History and Heritage Command's Curatorial Management Branch.

Osburn was inducted into the USA Shooting Hall of Fame in 1994, where he is listed as being one of the country's nine greatest marksmen.

See also
List of multiple Olympic gold medalists
List of multiple Olympic gold medalists at a single Games
List of multiple Summer Olympic medalists

References

External links
 

|-

|-

|-

1884 births
1966 deaths
American male sport shooters
United States Distinguished Marksman
ISSF rifle shooters
Shooters at the 1912 Summer Olympics
Shooters at the 1920 Summer Olympics
Shooters at the 1924 Summer Olympics
Olympic gold medalists for the United States in shooting
Olympic silver medalists for the United States in shooting
Olympic bronze medalists for the United States in shooting
United States Navy officers
People from Licking County, Ohio
People from St. Helena, California
Medalists at the 1912 Summer Olympics
Medalists at the 1920 Summer Olympics
Medalists at the 1924 Summer Olympics
Military personnel from California
19th-century American people
20th-century American people